Marcos Domingos Dias (born 30 November 2001) is a Brazilian footballer who plays as a forward for New England Revolution II in MLS Next Pro on loan from Vasco da Gama.

Early life
He played in the youth system of Palmeiras, where he won the 2018 Under-17 Club World Cup and the 2019 U20 Paulistão.

In March 2020, Dias joined the youth system of CR Vasco da Gama, playing with the U20 side, on an initial one year contract. In February 2021, he entended his contract through August 2022 with a €40 million release clause, and in December 2021, he once again extended his contract with Vasco through 2023. With the U20s, he scored 21 goals in 87 games and won the U20 Copa de Brasil, U20 Carioca and Supercopa de Brasil in 2020.

Club career
In January 2022, he joined New England Revolution II in MLS Next Pro on loan through December, although his arrival to the club was delayed until April due to visa issues. The deal includes a 50% mandatory obligigation to buy if Dias meets some performance targets. He made his debut on 1 May against Inter Miami II. He scored his first goal on 14 May against Toronto FC II.

Personal
Dias has a daughter born in August 2021.

References

External links
 

2001 births
Living people
Brazilian footballers
Sociedade Esportiva Palmeiras players
CR Vasco da Gama players
New England Revolution II players
MLS Next Pro players
Association football wingers